Monika Debertshãuser (later Heßler, born 18 September 1952) is a former East German cross-country skier who competed during the 1970s. She won a bronze medal in the 4 × 5 km relay at the 1976 Winter Olympics in Innsbruck. She was later married to Gerd Heßler but divorced.

References

External links
Women's cross country results: 1952–2006

Cross-country skiers at the 1976 Winter Olympics
1952 births
Living people
Olympic medalists in cross-country skiing
East German female cross-country skiers
Medalists at the 1976 Winter Olympics
Olympic bronze medalists for East Germany